Lori Ann Mundt (born May 19, 1971) is a retired female volleyball player from Canada.

Mundt competed for her native country at the 1996 Summer Olympics in Atlanta, Georgia. There the resident of Winnipeg, Manitoba finished in 10th place with the Women's National Team.

References
Canadian Olympic Committee

1971 births
Canadian women's volleyball players
Living people
Olympic volleyball players of Canada
Sportspeople from Winnipeg
Sportspeople from Yorkton
Volleyball players at the 1996 Summer Olympics
Pan American Games bronze medalists for Canada
Pan American Games medalists in volleyball
Volleyball players at the 1995 Pan American Games
Medalists at the 1995 Pan American Games